Guano is a location in the Chimborazo Province, Ecuador. It is the seat of the Guano Canton. The town is well known for its handmade leather products and ornate rugs.

Surrounded by landscapes of mountains and overshadowed by the nearby active volcano, El Altar, the town features a variety of attractions and activities. Small in size, it can be explored easily on foot.

References 

 www.inec.gov.ec
 www.ame.gov.ec

External links 
 Map of the Chimborazo Province

Populated places in Chimborazo Province